The 2020 West Coast Conference women's basketball tournament was played between March 5–10, 2020, at Orleans Arena in Las Vegas, Portland was the winner of the WCC Women's Tournament would automatically advance to the 2020 NCAA Tournament.

Seeds
All 10 WCC schools will participate in the tournament. Teams will be seeded by conference record, with the following tiebreaker system used to seed teams with identical conference records:
 Head-to-head record.
 Record against the top team in the conference not involved in the tie, going down through the standings as necessary to break the tie. Should more than one team be tied for a position in the standings, collective records against all teams involved in that tie are considered.
 RPI at the end of the conference season.

* Overall record at end of regular season.

Schedule

Bracket and scores
All games except the championship aired on BYUtv games and were simulcast on WCC Network and multiple RSN's: NBC Sports Bay Area, Fox Sports Prime Ticket, Fox Sports San Diego, and Root Sports. . The championship aired on ESPNU.

* denotes overtime game

See also

 2019-20 NCAA Division I women's basketball season
 West Coast Conference men's basketball tournament
 2020 West Coast Conference men's basketball tournament
 West Coast Conference women's basketball tournament

References

External links

Tournament
West Coast Conference women's basketball tournament
2020 in sports in Nevada
Basketball competitions in the Las Vegas Valley
College basketball tournaments in Nevada
Women's sports in Nevada
College sports tournaments in Nevada